The West Rügen Bodden ( or Rügenschen Außenboddenkette) are a string of lagoons and embayments, known as bodden, in Western Pomerania on the Baltic Sea coast. They lie in the Western Pomerania Lagoon Area National Park west and southwest of the island of Rügen, and east and southeast of Hiddensee.

The individual lagoons or bodden that make up the West Rügen Bodden are the:
 Vitter Bodden
 Schaproder Bodden
 Udarser Wiek
 Kubitzer Bodden

(listed from north to south; several smaller linking waterbodies are not mentioned)

See also 
 North Rügen Bodden
 Darss-Zingst Bodden Chain

 
Boddens of Mecklenburg-Western Pomerania
Geography of Rügen